Events from the year 1961 in Pakistan.

Incumbents
President: Ayub Khan
Chief Justice: A.R. Cornelius

Events

May
 6 May,   Constitution Commission, appointed by President Ayub Khan, presents its report, specifying pinpoints the failures of   parliamentary  government in Pakistan.

Births
8 January - Shoaib Mohammad, cricketer

See also
 1960 in Pakistan
 1962 in Pakistan
 List of Pakistani films of 1961
 Timeline of Pakistani history

 
1961 in Asia